Arena Bonifika is an indoor sporting arena located in Koper, Slovenia with a seating capacity for 3,000 spectators. The hall is a part of the Bonifika Sports Complex, together with a smaller athletics stadium, and an indoor swimming pool. In 2013, Arena Bonifika was one of the venues for EuroBasket 2013.

See also
 List of indoor arenas in Slovenia

References

External links
Bonifka Arena

Indoor arenas in Slovenia
Buildings and structures in Koper
Sport in Koper
Basketball venues in Slovenia
Sports venues in the Slovene Littoral
Sports venues completed in 1999
Handball venues in Slovenia
1999 establishments in Slovenia
20th-century architecture in Slovenia